Per Lindberg (5 March 1890 – 7 February 1944) was a Swedish theatre and film director.

Biography
Lindberg was born in Stockholm as the son of the actress Augusta Lindberg and the actor, theater director and manager August Lindberg. His sister was the writer Stina Bergman. Already as a schoolboy, Lindberg accompanied his father on a theater trip to Berlin. In 1909, he became a student  at Stockholm  University. During 1911-1912, Lindberg interrupted his studies to accompany his father on his tour through North America.  Lindberg  made his stage debut when in Chicago on January 21, 1912.
Lindberg was the first director at the  Comedy Theatre (Komediteatern)  and  Concert Theater (Konserthusteatern) in Stockholm 1925-1927, at the Royal Dramatic Theatre 1927–1928, and was then theater director at Sveriges Radiotjänst   1929–1931.

As a  film director, Lindberg was heavily influenced by Austrian director Max Reinhardt and German Expressionism of the 1920s. He is best known for directing June Nights (1940) with Ingrid Bergman.

Selected filmography
 Anna-Clara and Her Brothers (1923)
 June Night (1940)
 The Talk of the Town (1941)
 In Paradise (1941)

References

External links

1890 births
1944 deaths
Artists from Stockholm
Swedish film directors
Swedish theatre directors